Piet Fransen (5 July 1936 – 2 August 2015) was a Dutch footballer who played as a midfielder.

Club career
Nicknamed Mr. FC Groningen, Fransen played the majority of his career for FC Groningen and its predecessor GVAV. He totalled 484 official matches for the club, scoring 82 goals. He started his career at Velocitas and was part of their first professional Tweede Divisie squad, when the third professional football league was introduced in the Netherlands in 1956.

He also had a spell at Feyenoord.

International career
He made his debut for the Netherlands in an October 1964 FIFA World Cup qualification match against Albania and has earned a total of 6 caps, scoring 1 goal. He represented his country in 3 FIFA World Cup qualification matches.

His final international was a March 1966 friendly match against West Germany.

International goals
Scores and results list the Netherlands' goal tally first.

Death and legacy
He died on 2 August 2015 in Groningen. A minute of silence was held ahead of the Johan Cruijff Shield match between Groningen and PSV Eindhoven later that day.

In 2007 a street in Groningen at the former Oosterpark Stadion terrain was named after Fransen. In 2011, the east stand of the Euroborg stadium was named Piet Fransen Stand.

References

External links

Player profile - Feyenoord-Online

1936 births
2015 deaths
Footballers from Groningen (city)
Association football midfielders
Dutch footballers
Netherlands international footballers
FC Groningen players
Feyenoord players